PXE may refer to:

 Preboot Execution Environment, booting computers via a network
 Proof and Experimental Establishment, an Indian defense laboratory
 Pseudoxanthoma elasticum, a genetic disease
 Pentium Extreme Edition, a variant of Pentium D microprocessor

See also
 Pex (disambiguation)

it:PXE